In enzymology, a D-2-hydroxyglutarate dehydrogenase is an enzyme that catalyzes the chemical reaction

(R)-2-hydroxyglutarate + acceptor  2-oxoglutarate + reduced acceptor

Thus, the two substrates of this enzyme are (R)-2-hydroxyglutarate and acceptor, whereas its two products are 2-oxoglutarate and reduced acceptor.

The enzyme activity has been confirmed in animals 
as well as in plants
.

Nomenclature 

This enzyme belongs to the family of oxidoreductases, specifically those acting on the CH-OH group of donor with other acceptors.  The systematic name of this enzyme class is (R)-2-hydroxyglutarate:acceptor 2-oxidoreductase. Other names in common use include:

 (R)-2-hydroxyglutarate:(acceptor) 2-oxidoreductase
 alpha-hydroxyglutarate dehydrogenase
 alpha-hydroxyglutarate dehydrogenase (NAD specific)
 alpha-hydroxyglutarate oxidoreductase
 alpha-ketoglutarate reductase
 hydroxyglutaric dehydrogenase
 D-alpha-hydroxyglutarate dehydrogenase
 D-alpha-hydroxyglutarate:NAD 2-oxidoreductase

Clinical significance 

Deficiency in this enzyme in humans (D2HGDH) or in the model plant Arabidopsis thaliana (At4g36400) leads to massive accumulation of D-2-hydroxyglutarate. In humans this results in the fatal neurometabolic disorder 2-Hydroxyglutaric aciduria whereas plants seem to be to a large extent unaffected by high cellular concentrations of this compound.

See also
 D2HGDH
 L2HGDH
 L-2-hydroxyglutarate dehydrogenase
 2-hydroxyglutarate synthase
 Alpha-Hydroxyglutaric acid
 2-Hydroxyglutaric aciduria
 Hydroxyacid-oxoacid transhydrogenase

References

Further reading 

 

EC 1.1.99
Enzymes of unknown structure